Here We Come is the debut studio album by British-Norwegian boy band A1. It was released on 22 November 1999. The album was certified as Gold in the UK, selling nearly 100,000 copies.

Track listing

B-side songs

Charts and certifications

Charts

Year-end charts

Certifications

References

A1 (band) albums
1999 debut albums
Epic Records albums